Han (Hangul 한, Hanja 韓) is the typical romanized spelling of the Korean family name. Other alternate spellings for 한 include Hahn and Haan. In hanja, it translates to "King”, “Kingdom”, “country" and/or “Korean people”. Han is the oldest name in Korea.

Clans
As with all the Korean family names, the holders of the Han surname are divided into different patrilineal clans, or lineages, known in Korean as bon-gwan, based on their ancestral seat. Most such clans trace their lineage back to a specific founder. This system was at its height under the Joseon Dynasty, but it remains in use today. There are approximately 241 such clans claimed by South Koreans.

Cheongju clan 
Cheongju Han clan is considered one of the noble clans of Korea, with the Gyeongju Kim, Gimhae Kim, Miryang Park, Gyeongju Seok, Pyeongyang Ko, and Jeonju Yi clans. In the Silla Dynasty, all of the Cheongju Hans were part of the seonggol rank.

During the Joseon Dynasty, the Cheongju Han clan produced 16 queens and were considered the highest of the yangban class, next to the Jeonju Yi clan. Considered one of the most prominent clans since the Gija period of the ancient Gojoseon Kingdom, the clan provided the Joseon Dynasty with the biggest number of generals, including Han Myeong-hoe, who was one Joseon's greatest generals and the father of Queen Jangsun (first wife of Yejong) and Queen Gonghye (first wife of Seongjong).

Danju clan 
The Danju Han clan was founded by Han Chong-rye, in the 10th century AD.

Samhwa clan 
Its representative person is the calligrapher Han Ho.

Goksan clan 
Han Ye, the founder of the Goksan Han clan, came to Goryeo from the Song Dynasty, in 1206. His descendants include Han Yi-won (韓以原), who lived during the reign of Sukjong of Joseon, and excelled in poetry and epidemiology and Han Yeo-yu (韓汝愈), Han Si-yu (韓是愈), and Han Mun-gun (韓文健), who gained fame as scholars.

In 2015, there were 6,266 members of Goksan Han clan in South Korea.

Notable People With The Surname: 한

Singers
 Han Sang-hyuk (stage name Hyuk), South Korean singer, dancer and actor, member of boy band VIXX
 Han Seung-woo, South Korean singer, rapper, dancer and actor, member of boy band Victon, former member of boy band X1
 Han Seung-yeon, South Korean singer and actress, former member of girl group Kara
 Han Sun-hwa, South Korean singer and actress, former member of girl group Secret
 Han Hye-ri, South Korean singer and actress, former member of  girl group I.B.I

Actors and actresses
 Han Bo-bae
 Han Bo-reum
 Han Chae-ah
 Han Chae-young
 Han Da-min
 Han Do-woo
 Han Eun-jung
 Han Ga-in
 Han Go-eun
 Han Hye-jin
 Han Hye-rin
 Han Hye-sook
 Han Hyo-joo
 Han Jae-suk
 Han Ji-an
 Han Ji-eun
 Han Ji-hye
 Han Ji-hyun
 Han Ji-min
 Han Ji-sang
 Han Ji-wan
 Han Jin-hee
 Han Joo-wan
 Han Joon-woo
 Han Jung-soo
 Han Ki-woong
 Han Na-na
 Han Sang-jin
 Han So-hee
 Han Soo-yeon
 Han Suk-kyu
 Han Sung-yun
 Han Ye-ri
 Han Ye-seul
 Han Yeo-reum

Sports
 Han Kyu-chul, South Korean swimmer
 Han Min-su, South Korean male sledge hockey player
 Han Seung-woo, South Korean shooter

Fictional Characters
 Han Ji-pyeong (Start-Up, portrayed by Kim Seon-ho)
 Han Seo-jun (True Beauty, portrayed by Hwang In-yeop)
 Han Joon-gi (Yakuza/Ryu Ga Gotoku, Voiced by Yuichi Nakamura)

Others
 Consort Han, Korean concubine of Emperor Hongwu of the Chinese Ming dynasty
 Han Terra, South Korean polymath
 Byung-chul Han, South Korean-born Swiss-German philosopher
 Han Chang-seob (born 1967), South Korean public official
 Han Hye-jin, South Korean model
Han Seok-bong, a leading calligrapher during middle Joseon

Related surnames with Cheongju Han 

There are two Korean surnames which are believed to be related and share common ancestry and origin with the Cheongju Han. The Taewon Seonwoo and the Hangju Gi clans are believed to have originated from the same root as the Cheongju Han clan.

According to genealogical records, Gijun, the last King of Gojoseon, is believed to have had three sons, U-Pyeong (우평), U-Seong (우성) and U-Ryang (우량). During Korea's Three Kingdoms period, U-Pyeong is said to have settled in Goguryeo, and his descendants later established the Taewon Seonwoo clan, U-Seong is said to have settled in Baekje, and his descendants later established the Hangju Gi clan and finally, U-Ryang is said to have settled in Silla and his descendants later established the Cheongju Han clan, with its bon-gwan in Cheongju.

Han and Gojoseon 
See also: List of monarchs of Korea, Gojoseon, Gija Joseon, Samhan, Proto–Three Kingdoms of Korea

Many Korean historians believe that Gijun of Gojoseon was actually "Hanjun"(한준) and had the surname Han (韓), not Gi and that all of the Kings of Gojoseon were of the surname Han (韓).

There is a controversy over Gija's origin. It is believed that he came from the Chinese Shang Dynasty and was a paternal uncle (or brother) of the last Shang ruler, King Zhou, however Gija likely came from the Eastern Yi. Gija and his descendants were also believed to have the surname Han (韓), as Jun, the last King of Gojoseon and a descendant of Gija, who, after fleeing from Wiman, claimed himself as the King of Han (한왕; 韓王), when he founded Mahan (part of the Samhan). With this it shows that the surname Han may have existed since the time of Gojoseon and establishes the Han clan (韓) as the oldest surname in Korea (dating back to around 5000 years ago) and as the rulers Gojoseon and Mahan.

However, many Korean historians deny any existence of Gija and Gija Joseon, accepting it as a legend.

References

See also
 Han (name)
 Cheongju Han clan
Korean-language surnames
Surnames of Korean origin